Repulse Bay is a bay in Hong Kong.

Repulse Bay may also refer to:

Repulse Bay Beach in Hong Kong
Repulse Bay, Nunavut, now called Naujaat
Repulse Bay to Ince Bay Important Bird Area, a stretch of beach in Central Queensland, Australia
Repulse Bay, Queensland, see Estuary stingray
The Repulse Bay, a development in Hong Kong